Nygmia xanthomela is a moth of the family Erebidae first described by Francis Walker in 1862. It is found in Sri Lanka, Borneo, Java, Sumatra and Peninsular Malaysia.

Description
Forewings are orange yellow with a darker scaly suffusion. The caterpillar is dark brownish grey with a broad grey dorsal band. Head yellowish. The caterpillar is known to feed on Dioscorea, Annona, Tamarindus, Citrus, Loranthus, Theobroma cacao, Lagerstroemia indica, Camellia sinensis and Eriobotrya japonica.

Subspecies
Three subspecies are recognized.
Nygmia xanthomela catala (Holloway, 1982) - Java, Sumatra
Nygmia xanthomela postlutosa (Swinhoe, 1903) - Peninsular Malaysia
Nygmia xanthomela xanthomela - India, Sri Lanka

References

Moths of Asia
Moths described in 1862